Le maître d'école is a 1981 French comedy film directed by Claude Berri.

Plot 
Gérard Barbier was a clothing salesman. Dismissed because he defended a child caught stealing boots, he decided to become a teacher. Once at school, he realized that this teaching profession is not quite as he had seen it.

Cast 
 Coluche : Gérard Barbier
 Josiane Balasko : Mrs. Lajoie
 Jacques Debary : Director
 Charlotte de Turckheim : Charlotte
 Roland Giraud : Mr. Meignant
 André Chaumeau : Academic advisor
 Jean Champion : Inspector
 Georges Staquet : Gérard's father

References

External links
 
 

1981 comedy films
1981 films
Films directed by Claude Berri
French comedy films
1980s French-language films
1980s French films